も, in hiragana, or モ in katakana, is one of the Japanese kana, each of which represents one mora. Both are made in three strokes and both represent .

モー is sometimes used as the onomatopoeia for cows.

Stroke order

Other communicative representations

 Full Braille representation

 Computer encodings

References

Specific kana